Chris Waller may refer to:

 Chris Waller (gymnast) (born 1968), American gymnast
 Chris Waller (cricketer) (born 1948), English cricketer
 Chris Waller (actor), British actor
 Chris Waller (horse trainer), (born 1973), New Zealand born champion thoroughbred horse trainer